The Hon. William Henry Wentworth-FitzWilliam (26 December 1840 – 10 July 1920), was a British Liberal, and later Liberal Unionist politician.

Background
Wentworth-FitzWilliam was the second son of William Wentworth-FitzWilliam, 6th Earl FitzWilliam, and Lady Frances Harriet, daughter of George Douglas, 17th Earl of Morton. Viscount Milton, the Hon. Charles Wentworth-FitzWilliam and the Hon. John Wentworth-FitzWilliam were his brothers

Political career
Wentworth-FitzWilliam entered Parliament for Wicklow in 1868, a seat he held until 1874. He later represented the West Riding of Yorkshire South between 1880 and 1885 and Doncaster between 1888 and 1892. Initially a Liberal, he disagreed with William Ewart Gladstone over Irish Home Rule and sat as a Liberal Unionist between 1888 and 1892.

Family
Wentworth-FitzWilliam married Lady Mary Grace Louisa, daughter of John Butler, 2nd Marquess of Ormonde, in 1877. He died in July 1920, aged 79. Lady Mary died in January 1929, aged 82.

References

External links 
 

1840 births
1920 deaths
Younger sons of earls
Liberal Party (UK) MPs for English constituencies
Liberal Unionist Party MPs for English constituencies
Members of the Parliament of the United Kingdom for County Wicklow constituencies (1801–1922)
UK MPs 1868–1874
UK MPs 1880–1885
UK MPs 1886–1892
Irish Liberal Party MPs